
Robert McLeod or Bob McLeod may refer to:

Sports
 Bob McLeod (cricketer) (1868–1907), Australian cricketer
 Bob McLeod (cyclist) (1913–1958), Canadian Olympic cyclist
 Bob McLeod (American football) (born 1938), American football player

Politics
 Robert C. McLeod (Prince Edward Island politician) (1851–1905)
 Robert C. McLeod (Northwest Territories politician) (born 1960), politician in the Northwest Territories, Canada
 Bob McLeod (politician) (born 1952), Premier of the Northwest Territories, Canada

Other
 Bob McLeod (comics) (born 1951), American comic book artist
 Robert MacLeod (born 1964), British businessman

See also
 Bob MacLeod (1917–2003), American football player
 Robert Macleod, mayor  of Palmerston, Northern Territory, Australia
 Robert MacLeod, pseudonym of Bill Knox